Timur Turlov (born November 13, 1987) is a Russian-born Kazakh entrepreneur and financier. He is the founder of Almaty-based Freedom Finance.

Biography

Education 
In 2009 he graduated from Moscow Aviation Technology University (MATI) as economist manager.

Early career
For the first time, Turlov got interested in stock market investments while studying at school.

Right after graduating high school in 2003, he started working in the Moscow branch of World Capital Investments (WCI), an American investment company. He worked as a trader.

In 2005, Turlov was hired by Yutreyd.ru, a subsidiary of “Uniastrum Bank” (Moscow), to deal with the American stock market operations. He succeeded and built an infrastructure, which gave a unit an access to US stock exchanges. During the 2008 global financial crisis, Uniastrum Bank was sold to the Bank of Cyprus and the trading unit where Turlov worked was closed.
Back then, he and his colleagues decided to use their knowledge and experience to run their own company.

Freedom Finance 

In 2008, Timur Turlov founded Freedom Finance, which provides access to US stock exchanges and brokerage services. As of 2022, Freedom Finance was represented in thirteen countries.

Turlov grew the business by attracting retail investors through active selling of American securities. In 2018, the company earned the "Financial Elite of Russia" award and was recognized as the most fast-growing broker. At the beginning of 2022, Freedom Finance was ranked 8th among the largest brokerage companies operating at the Moscow Exchange. The ranking was based on the number of the companies' registered clients.

In 2011, Turlov and his family moved to Kazakhstan, where two years later he opened the subsidiary Freedom Finance JSC. As of 2022, the subsidiary was the most active trading participant at the Kazakhstan Stock Exchange.

In 2015, Turlov became the main shareholder of Freedom Holding Corp.
He used this brand to put Freedom Finance Investment Company, Freedom Finance JSC, Freedom24 and Freedom Finance Bank under one umbrella label.

In 2015 – 2018, subsidiaries of Freedom Holding were opened in Ukraine, Kyrgyzstan, Uzbekistan, Germany and Cyprus.
In 2019, Timur Turlov made the holding public by listing shares on the American technology stock exchange Nasdaq. Thus, Freedom Holding became the first financial institution from the Commonwealth of Independent states to be listed on the Nasdaq Stock market. 

In 2022, Turlov said in an interview with Reuters that Freedom Holding Corp would withdraw from the Russian market. The company exited Russia in October the same year.

Wealth
In 2021, Turlov was ranked 1517th on the Forbes Global 2000 list. It was recorded that his fortune reached $2,1 billion. A year later, he was on the Forbes list of the wealthiest people in Kazakhstan, ranking 7th. His worth was estimated at $2,2 billion.

Other
Turlov is a columnist for the American version of Forbes. In December 2022, he was included in Ukraine's sanctions list. His Ukraine-based company called this decision a "mechanical error" and planned to appeal against it.

In January 2023, Turlov became the head of Kazakhstan Chess Federation.

Personal life 

Turlov is married and has five children. He has been domiciled in Kazakhstan since moving there in 2011 and is a tax resident of the country. 

In June 2022, Turlov confirmed that he had acquired Kazakh citizenship after renouncing his Russian and St. Kitts and Nevis citizenship.

References 

1987 births
Living people
Russian activists against the 2022 Russian invasion of Ukraine
People who lost Russian citizenship